Donari Braxton (born November 11, 1982) is an American filmmaker and writer. His independent narrative films are generally considered experimental, though have been featured diversely both in film festivals and art film reviews internationally. He's known for creating performance and video art for gallery exhibition, and with the 2013 launch of the photo/video series "how-to-be-alone.com", began freely releasing and distributing such content online. His work has been supported by NPR, the San Francisco Film Society, the Independent Filmmaker Project, Sundance, Film Independent, and the Berlinale Talents, amongst other institutions.

Braxton was born in New York City and is the son of seminal new wave composer and music philosopher Anthony Braxton. Like his father, he is known for being an avid chess player, and is said to be a chessmaster. In 2006, his first published work, I, a collection of short stories, was met with critical acclaim and became largely associated with the avant-garde or "New Chemical Generation" of contemporary fiction. In 2010, he co-founded with Takeshi Fukunaga the production company "FX-S," which later became "TELEVISION." The company's produced video content for companies such as HBO, Puma and Marc Jacobs.

In 2015, their first narrative feature, "Out of My Hand," premiered at the 2015 Berlin International Film Festival and was theatrically released by Ava DuVernay's ARRAY pictures in November 2015. Braxton was later nominated for the John Cassavetes Film Independent Spirit Award for his work as writer/producer on the project. In 2016, the San Francisco Film Society announced Braxton's developing feature, "Above," would be a science-fiction drama, granting it the 2016 KRF Screenwriting Grant & Fellowship.

Braxton's photography and editorials have been widely published in magazines such as GQ, Details, Surface and Playboy, amongst others.

Select filmography
 The Inevitable Me (2009)
 Oh, The Predictable Beasts (2011)
 hItec! (2010)
 'Themes from a Rosary (2010)
 'The Future of All Fragile Things (2015 ET)
 Out of My Hand (2015)

Bibliography
 The Ballad of Chico Walfer, Announcing, (2014)
 No One's Rose, Paul Celan Translations, (2006)
 I, Slow Toe Publication, (2005)
 On My Generation; Poetry and Politics, Slow Toe Publication, (2004)

External links
DonariBraxton.Com
Television
how to be alone . com
Bullet Magazine

GQ
T-FAR
hItec!
3:AM
BLATT
Beautiful Savage

References

Living people
American male poets
21st-century American dramatists and playwrights
American film directors
American male screenwriters
American video artists
American film producers
1982 births
American male dramatists and playwrights
African-American film directors
African-American dramatists and playwrights
21st-century American male writers
21st-century American poets
21st-century American screenwriters
African-American screenwriters
African-American poets
21st-century African-American writers
20th-century African-American people
African-American male writers